Enzo Geerts  (born 3 January 2005) is a Belgian footballer who is at  PSV Eindhoven as a midfielder. He is also a Belgian youth international.

Early life
Geerts was a youth player at KSC Keerbergen and then KV Mechelen in his native Belgium.

Career
He joined Dutch side PSV Eindhoven in 2017 who beat off competition from Belgian sides such as Club Brugge
and K.R.C. Genk for his signing. He signed his first professional contract with PSV in July 2021. In August 2022 he signed a new three-year contract with PSV taking him up to 2025.

He made his Eerste Divisie match day squad debut on 6 January, 2023 as Jong PSV played at away against NAC Breda at the Rat Verlegh Stadion. He made his senior debut on 20 January, 2023 appearing as a substitute as FC Den Bosch hosted Jong PSV in the league at the De Vliert Stadium.

International career
Geerts has represented Belgium at under-17 level.

References

External links

2005 births
Living people
Belgian footballers
Jong PSV players 
Eerste Divisie players